Lane is a given name, generally though not exclusively masculine. It may refer to:

People
Lane Adams (born 1989), American baseball player
Lane K. Akiona, Hawaiian Roman Catholic priest
Lane Beattie (born 1951), American businessman and politician
Lane Bradbury (born 1938), American actress and writer
Lane Bradford (1922–1973), American actor
Lane Brody (born 1955), American singer-songwriter
Lane Burroughs, American basketball player and coach
Lane Carlson (born 1978), American model
Lane Carson (born 1947), American politician
Lane Chandler (1899–1972), American actor
Lane Davies (born 1950), American actor
Lane DeGregory, American journalist
Lane Dwinell (1906–1997), American politician
Lane Evans (born 1951), American politician
Lane Fenner (born 1945), American football player
Lane Frost (1963–1989), American bull rider
Lane Garrison (born 1980), American actor
Lane Gibson, American musician and recording engineer
Lane P. Hughston (born 1951), American mathematician 
Lane Janger (born 1966), American film producer
Lane Johnson (born 1990), American football player
Lane Kenworthy, American sociologist
Lane Kiffin (born 1975), American football coach
Lane Kirkland (1922–1999), American labor union leader
Lane Lambert (born 1964), Canadian ice hockey player
Lane Lindell (born 1990), American model
Lane Lord (born 1971), American women's basketball coach
Lane MacDermid (born 1989), American ice hockey player
Lane MacDonald (born 1966), American ice hockey player
Lane McCotter, American prison administrator
Lane McCray (born 1960), American singer and musician
Lane Moore, American comedian, actress, writer and musician
Lane Murdock (born 2002), American youth activist
Lane Napper (born 1967), American actor and dancer
Lane Nishikawa, American actor, playwright and performance artist
Lane Penn, New Zealand rugby union player, coach and administrator 
Lane Roberts, American politician 
Lane Smith (1936–2005), American actor
Lane Smith (illustrator) (born 1959), American children's illustrator and author
Lane Taylor (born 1989), American football player
Lane Thomas (born 1995), American baseball player
Lane Tietgen, American poet and musician
Lane Toran (born 1982), American actor and musician
Lane Turner (born 1967), American country singer-songwriter
V. Lane Rawlins (born 1937), American university president

Fictional characters
Lane Alexander, in Victorious
Lane Kim, in Gilmore Girls
Lane Meyer, in Better Off Dead
Lane Pryce, in Mad Men